Thomas Dacres (1609–1668) was an English politician who sat in the House of Commons  from 1646 to 1648.

Dacres was the son  of Sir Thomas Dacres of Cheshunt, Hertfordshire. He matriculated at Exeter College, Oxford on 16 October 1629 aged 20 and was awarded MA on 12 November 1629 when he was "about to go with his Majesty's ambassador into foreign parts" He was at Lincoln's Inn in 1631. In 1632 he was awarded MA at Cambridge University.
  
In 1646, Dacres was elected Member of Parliament for Callington in the Long Parliament. He sat until he was excluded under Pride's Purge in 1648.

Dacres was knighted in 1660. He died in 1668.

References

1609 births
1668 deaths
English MPs 1640–1648
Alumni of Exeter College, Oxford
Alumni of the University of Cambridge
Members of Lincoln's Inn
Members of the Parliament of England for Callington